Breaking Dawn is the first Japanese studio album by South Korean boy group the Boyz. It was released on March 17, 2021, through Ariola Japan. The album debuted at number four on the Oricon Albums Chart, selling over 20,000 physical copies in its first week.

Background 
On January 12, The Boyz's first Japanese studio album was announced. It is the group's first Japanese comeback since their 2019 extended play Tattoo.

Track listing

Charts

Weekly charts

Yearly charts

References 

2021 albums
The Boyz (South Korean band) albums